Richard Bruce Hansen (14 February 1928 – 12 May 2002) was a New Zealand equestrian. He competed in two events at the 1964 Summer Olympics together with his brother Graeme Hansen. In March 2020, the entire 1964 Olympic equestrian team of four riders (including Charlie Matthews, who as reserve did not get to compete) was inducted into the Equestrian Sports New Zealand Hall of Fame.

References

External links
 

1928 births
2002 deaths
New Zealand male equestrians
Olympic equestrians of New Zealand
Equestrians at the 1964 Summer Olympics
Sportspeople from Gisborne, New Zealand